The River Styx is a  stream in Marquette County, Michigan, in the United States. It flows from the outlet of Ives Lake north over a waterfall to Third Lake, an arm of Pine Lake. Via the Pine River (the outlet of Pine Lake), water from the River Styx flows to Lake Superior.

See also
List of rivers of Michigan

References

Michigan Streamflow Data from the USGS

Rivers of Michigan
Rivers of Marquette County, Michigan
Tributaries of Lake Superior